The 2021 ICF Canoe Marathon World Championships was held from 30 September to 3 October 2021 in Pitești, Romania.

Medalists

Short Race Medalists

Under-23 Medalists

Junior Medalists

Medal table

References

ICF Canoe Marathon World Championships
World Championships
2021 in Romanian sport
International sports competitions hosted by Romania
Sport in Pitești
Canoeing in Romania
ICF
ICF